Magham Sewer is a minor,  long river (brook) and drainage ditch of the Pevensey Levels in the civil parish of Hailsham, Wealden District of East Sussex, England, that is a tributary of Puckeridge Stream. The river acts as a drainage basin for several smaller ditches, including streams from Puckeridge Stream.

Course 
Located entirely in the civil parish of Hailsham, Magham Sewer rises in south Magham Down just east of the village of Hailsham, and flows easterly.

References 

Rivers of East Sussex
Rivers of the Pevensey Levels